The Helen Hayes Awards are given to resident theatre productions in the Washington, D.C. metropolitan area. They include awards for the production itself, the direction, the acting, design and the stage plays themselves.

The awards were named after Helen Hayes, known as the First Lady of the American Theatre, who was born in Washington, DC. 

The Helen Hayes Awards are traditionally given every spring. The 2023 edition will take place on May 22, 2023 at The Anthem.

Production

Best Resident Production
 1985 Cloud 9 – Arena Stage
 The Beautiful Lady – New Playwrights' Theatre
 Lydie Breeze – New Playwrights' Theatre
 Man and Superman – Arena Stage
 My Sister in This House – The Studio Theatre

Outstanding Production of a Resident Play
 1987 The Miser – The Shakespeare Theatre
 Christmas on Mars – Woolly Mammoth Theatre Company
 Romeo and Juliet – The Shakespeare Theatre
 Slab Boys – The Studio Theatre
 The Birthday Party – The Studio Theatre
 The Wild Duck – Arena Stage
 Torch Song Trilogy – Castle Arts Center

Outstanding Resident Production
 1988 The Crucible – Arena Stage
 All the King's Men – Arena Stage
 As Is – The Studio Theatre
 Filthy Rich – Round House Theatre
 Noises Off – Olney Theatre
 Savage in Limbo – Woolly Mammoth Theatre Company
 1989 Six Characters in Search of an Author – Arena Stage
 Baby with the Bathwater – Round House Theatre
 Eleemosynary – Horizons Theatre
 Macbeth – The Shakespeare Theatre
 The Cherry Orchard – Arena Stage
 The Colored Museum – The Studio Theatre
 1990 Heathen Valley – Round House Theatre
 Bluesman – Source Theatre Company
 The Day Room – Woolly Mammoth Theatre Company
 The Dead Monkey – Woolly Mammoth Theatre Company
 The Man Who Came to Dinner – Arena Stage
 Twelfth Night – The Shakespeare Theatre
 1991 Stand-Up Tragedy – Arena Stage
 Frankie and Johnny in the Clair de Lune – The Studio Theatre
 Juno and the Paycock – Arena Stage
 Richard III – The Shakespeare Theatre
 The Caucasian Chalk Circle – Arena Stage
 The Merry Wives of Windsor – The Shakespeare Theatre
 1992 My Children! My Africa! – Arena Stage
 Fat Men in Skirts – Woolly Mammoth Theatre Company
 Jar the Floor – Arena Stage
 Psycho Beach Party – Source Theatre Company
 She Stoops to Conquer – Arena Stage
 When I Was a Girl I Used to Scream and Shout – The Studio Theatre

Outstanding Resident Play
 1986 Execution of Justice – Arena Stage
 Fool for Love – Round House Theatre
 Tartuffe – Arena Stage
 The Foreigner – Olney Theatre
 The Good Person of Setzuan – Arena Stage
 1993 Hamlet – The Shakespeare Theatre
 Elektra – Round House Theatre
 Kvetch – Woolly Mammoth Theatre Company
 Life During Wartime – Woolly Mammoth Theatre Company
 The Lisbon Traviata – The Studio Theatre
 The School for Wives – Arena Stage
 1994 Dancing at Lughnasa – Arena Stage
 Free Will and Wanton Lust – Woolly Mammoth Theatre Company
 Mother Courage and Her Children – The Shakespeare Theatre
 Porcelain – Consenting Adults Theatre Company
 Richard II – The Shakespeare Theatre
 Unidentified Human Remains and the True Nature of Love – Signature Theatre
 1995 Dream of a Common Language – Theater of the First Amendment
 Goodnight Desdemona (Good Morning Juliet) – Woolly Mammoth Theatre Company
 Henry IV – The Shakespeare Theatre
 The Price – Arena Stage
 The Revengers' Comedies – Arena Stage
 1996 The Pitchfork Disney – Woolly Mammoth Theatre Company
 Escape from Happiness – Round House Theatre
 Henry V – The Shakespeare Theatre
 I Am a Man – Arena Stage
 Long Day's Journey Into Night – Arena Stage
 The Three Sisters – The Studio Theatre
 1997 Two Trains Running – The Studio Theatre
 Arcadia – Arena Stage
 Henry VI – The Shakespeare Theatre
 Quills – Woolly Mammoth Theatre Company
 Volpone – The Shakespeare Theatre
 1998 Mourning Becomes Electra – The Shakespeare Theatre
 Never the Sinner – Rep Stage
 Never the Sinner – Signature Theatre
 Old Wicked Songs – The Studio Theatre
 Romeo and Juliet – Folger Shakespeare Library
 The Tempest – The Shakespeare Theatre
 Travels With My Aunt – Rep Stage
 1999 Nijinsky's Last Dance – Signature Theatre
 Much Ado About Nothing – Folger Shakespeare Library
 Peer Gynt – The Shakespeare Theatre
 Seven Guitars – The Studio Theatre
 The Old Settler – The Studio Theatre
 You Can't Take It with You – Arena Stage
 2000 Indian Ink – The Studio Theatre
 Edmond – Source Theatre Company
 How I Learned to Drive – Arena Stage
 King John – The Shakespeare Theatre
 The Dead Monkey – Woolly Mammoth Theatre Company
 2001 The Glass Menagerie – Round House Theatre and Everyman Theatre
 Collected Stories – Theater J
 Heaven – Woolly Mammoth Theatre Company
 MASTER HAROLD ... and the boys – The Studio Theatre
 Romeo and Juliet – Folger Theatre
 The Country Wife – The Shakespeare Theatre
 2002 Home – Round House Theatre
 Don Carlos – Shakespeare Theatre
 Jitney – Studio Theatre
 Major Barbara – Washington Stage Guild
 The Andersonville Trial – American Century Theatre
 The Invention of Love – Studio Theatre
 2003 Hamlet – Synetic Theater
 Born Guilty – Theater J
 Host and Guest – Synetic Theater
 She Stoops to Conquer – Folger Theatre
 The Little Foxes – The Shakespeare Theatre
 The Weir – Round House Theatre

Outstanding Production in a Resident Musical
 1987 Quilters – Castle Arts Center
 Beehive – Arena Stage
 Hot Mikado – Ford's Theatre
 Little Shop of Horrors – Olney Theatre

Outstanding Resident Musical
 1986 March of the Falsettos – The Studio Theatre
 A Chorus Line – Harlequin Dinner Theatre
 Baby – Olney Theatre
 Little Me – Ford's Theatre
 1988 A ... My Name is Alice – Horizons Theatre
 42nd Street – Harlequin Dinner Theatre
 A Dance Against Darkenss: Living With AIDS – D.C. Cabaret
 1989 The Cocoanuts – Arena Stage
 Elmer Gantry – Ford's Theatre
 Sanctuary D.C. – No-Neck Monsters Theatre Company
 Side by Side by Sondheim – Olney Theatre
 The Gifts of the Magi – The Studio Theatre
 1990 Lucky Stiff – Olney Theatre
 Don't Let This Dream Go (A Musical Celebration of Mahalia Jackson) – Ford's Theatre
 On the Town – Arena Stage
 Pins and Needles – Washington Jewish Theatre
 The Beggar's Opera – The Shakespeare Theatre
 1991 The Rocky Horror Show – Woolly Mammoth Theatre Company
 Amahl and the Night Visitors – The Kennedy Center
 Children with Stones – Source Theatre Company
 Me and My Girl – Harlequin Dinner Theatre
 Merrily We Roll Along – Arena Stage
 1992 Sweeney Todd – Signature Theatre
 A Wonderful Life – Arena Stage
 Damn Yankees – Harlequin Dinner Theatre
 Forever Plaid – Ford's Theatre
 1993 Assassins – Signature Theatre
 Closer Than Ever – The Rose Organization
 Executive Leverage – Source Theatre Company
 Falsettoland – The Studio Theatre
 Of Thee I Sing – Arena Stage
 1994 The Pirates of Penzance – Interact Theatre Company
 Five Guys Named Moe – Ford's Theatre
 Show Me Where the Good Times Are – Olney Theatre
 1995 Into the Woods – Signature Theatre
 God's Trombones – DC ART/WORKS (based on the poetry book of the same name)
 Hot Mikado – Ford's Theatre
 Iolanthe – Interact Theatre Company
 Wings – Signature Theatre
 1996 Bessie's Blues – The Studio Theatre
 Black Nativity – The Kennedy Center
 Cabaret – Signature Theatre
 H.M.S. Pinafore – Interact Theatre Company
 Jacques Brel Is Alive and Well and Living in Paris – Olney Theatre Center for the Arts
 1997 Passion – Signature Theatre
 Candide – Arena Stage
 Hip 2: Birth of the Boom – The Studio Theatre
 The Mikado – Interact Theatre Company
 The Rink – Signature Theatre
 Torn From the Headlines – Everyday Theatre
 Torn From the Headlines – The African Continuum Theatre Company
 1998 Hair, The American Tribal Love-Rock Musical – The Studio Theatre Secondstage
 Joseph and the Amazing Technicolor Dreamcoat – Toby's Dinner Theatre
 No Way to Treat a Lady – Signature Theatre
 Sherlock Holmes and the Case of the Purloined Patience or The Scandal at the D'Oyly Carte – Interact Theatre Company
 Sunday in the Park with George – Arena Stage
 Sunday in the Park with George – Signature Theatre
 1999 Thunder Knocking on the Door – Arena Stage
 A Little Night Music – Signature Theatre
 Brothers of the Knight – The Kennedy Center
 Marat/Sade – Washington Shakespeare Company
 The Fix – Signature Theatre in association with Cameron Mackintosh
 2000 Animal Crackers – Arena Stage
 Grimm Tales – Theater of the First Amendment
 Guys and Dolls – Arena Stage
 Slam! – The Studio Theatre
 Sweeney Todd – Signature Theatre
 The Cradle Will Rock – The American Century Theater
 2001 Side Show – Signature Theatre
 Dinah Was – Arena Stage
 Play On! – Arena Stage
 Sing Down the Moon: Appalachian Wonder Tales – Theater of the First Amendment
 The Rhythm Club – Signature Theatre
 You're A Good Man, Charlie Brown – Round House Theatre
 2002 Blues in the Night – Arena Stage
 A New Brain – Studio Theatre
 Joseph and the Amazing Technicolor Dreamcoat – Toby's Dinner Theatre
 Perseus Bayou – Theatre of the First Amendment
 Putting it Together – Signature Theatre
 Spunk – African Continuum Theatre Company
 2003 Sweeney Todd – The Kennedy Center
 Jekyll & Hyde The Musical – Toby's Dinner Theatre
 Polk County – Arena Stage
 South Pacific – Arena Stage
 Sunday in the Park with George – The Kennedy Center
 The Gospel According to Fishman – Signature Theatre

Direction

Outstanding Director of a Resident Production
 1985 Gary Pearle – Cloud 9 – Arena Stage
 Dorothy Neumann – Top Girls – Horizons Theatre
 Douglas C. Wager – Man and Superman – Arena Stage
 Elinor Renfield – Passion Play – Arena Stage
 Elizabeth Swados – The Beautiful Lady – New Playwrights' Theatre
 Joy Zinoman – My Sister in This House – The Studio Theatre
 1986 Douglas C. Wager – Execution of Justice – Arena Stage
 Garland Wright – The Good Person of Setzuan – Arena Stage
 Leslie Bravman Jacobson – Miss Lulu Bett – Horizons Theatre
 Lucian Pintilie – Tartuffe – Arena Stage
 Peter Sellars – The Count of Monte Cristo – American National Theatre
 Susann Brinkley – Fool for Love – Round House Theatre
 1987 John Going – The Miser – The Shakespeare Theatre
 Dorothy Neumann – Johnny Bull – Horizons Theatre
 Douglas C. Wager – The Taming of the Shrew – Arena Stage
 Gillian Drake – The Water Engine – Round House Theatre
 Joy Zinoman – Slab Boys – The Studio Theatre
 Lucian Pintilie – The Wild Duck – Arena Stage
 Michael Kahn – Romeo and Juliet – The Shakespeare Theatre
 1988 Zelda Fichandler – The Crucible – Arena Stage
 Douglas C. Wager – All the King's Men – Arena Stage
 James C. Nicola – Filthy Rich – Round House Theatre
 John Going – Noises Off – Olney Theatre
 Leslie Bravman Jacobson – A ... My Name is Alice – Horizons Theatre
 Michael Kahn – All's Well That Ends Well – The Shakespeare Theatre
 Yuri Lyubimov – Crime and Punishment – Arena Stage
 1989 Liviu Ciulei – Six Characters in Search of an Author – Arena Stage
 Douglas C. Wager – The Cocoanuts – Arena Stage
 Joe Banno – Tartuffe – Source Theatre Company
 Kim Rubinstein – Baby with the Bathwater – Round House Theatre
 Leslie Bravman Jacobson – Eleemosynary – Horizons Theatre
 Michael Kahn – Macbeth – The Shakespeare Theatre
 1990 Michael Kahn – Twelfth Night – The Shakespeare Theatre
 Douglas C. Wager – On the Town – Arena Stage
 Douglas C. Wager – The Man who Came to Dinner – Arena Stage
 Edward Morgan – Heathen Valley – Round House Theatre
 Howard Shalwitz – The Dead Monkey – Woolly Mammoth Theatre Company
 John Going – Lucky Stiff – Olney Theatre
 1991 Max Mayer – Stand-Up Tragedy – Arena Stage
 Joe Dowling – Juno and the Paycock – Arena Stage
 Joy Zinoman – Frankie and Johnny in the Clair de Lune – The Studio Theatre
 Michael Kahn – Richard III – The Shakespeare Theatre
 Michael Kahn – The Merry Wives of Windsor – The Shakespeare Theatre
 Tazewell Thompson – Fences – Arena Stage
 1992 Eric D. Schaeffer – Sweeney Todd – Signature Theatre
 Jim Stone – Julius Caesar – Washington Shakespeare Company
 Joe Dowling – She Stoops to Conquer – Arena Stage
 Joy Zinoman – When I Was a Girl I Used to Scream and Shout – The Studio Theatre
 Max Mayer – My Children! My Africa! – Arena Stage
 Stuart Ross – Forever Plaid – Ford's Theatre
 Tazewell Thompson – Jar the Floor – Arena Stage
 1994 Michael Kahn – Mother Courage and Her Children – The Shakespeare Theatre
 Catherine Flye – The Pirates of Penzance – Interact Theatre Company
 Dorothy Neumann – Unidentified Human Remains and the True Nature of Love – Signature Theatre
 Eric D. Schaeffer – Unidentified Human Remains and the True Nature of Love – Signature Theatre
 Kyle Donnelly – Dancing at Lughnasa – Arena Stage
 Ron Himes – Spunk – The Studio Theatre
 Van Riley – Porcelain – Consenting Adults Theatre Company

Outstanding Director of a Resident Play
 1993 Michael Kahn – Hamlet – The Shakespeare Theatre
 Bill Alexander – Troilus and Cressida – The Shakespeare Theatre
 Howard Shalwitz – Kvetch – Woolly Mammoth Theatre Company
 John Going – The Lisbon Traviata – The Studio Theatre
 Kyle Donnelly – The School for Wives – Arena Stage
 Lee Mikeska Gardner – Life During Wartime – Woolly Mammoth Theatre Company
 1995 Michael Kahn – Henry IV – The Shakespeare Theatre
 Douglas C. Wager – The Revengers' Comedies – Arena Stage
 Heather McDonald – Dream of a Common Language – Theater of the First Amendment
 Howard Shalwitz – Goodnight Desdemona (Good Morning Juliet) – Woolly Mammoth Theatre Company
 Lee Mikeska Gardner – Goodnight Desdemona (Good Morning Juliet) – Woolly Mammoth Theatre Company
 Nick Olcott – All in the Timing – Round House Theatre
 1996 Douglas C. Wager – Long Day's Journey Into Night – Arena Stage
 Daniel DeRaey – Escape from Happiness – Round House Theatre
 Donald Douglass – I Am a Man – Arena Stage
 Joy Zinoman – Three Sisters – The Studio Theatre
 Michael Kahn – Henry V – The Shakespeare Theatre
 Rob Bundy – The Pitchfork Disney – Woolly Mammoth Theatre Company
 1997 Michael Kahn – Henry VI – The Shakespeare Theatre
 Douglas C. Wager – Arcadia – Arena Stage
 Howard Shalwitz – Quills – Woolly Mammoth Theatre Company
 JoAnne Akalaitis – Dance of Death – Arena Stage
 Joe Banno – Cymbeline – Washington Shakespeare Company
 Thomas W. Jones II – Two Trains Running – The Studio Theatre
 1998 Joe Banno – Romeo and Juliet – Folger Shakespeare Library
 Ethan McSweeny – Never the Sinner – Rep Stage
 Ethan McSweeny – Never the Sinner – Signature Theatre
 Kasi Campbell – Travels With My Aunt – Rep Stage
 Mark A. Rhea – Translations – The Keegan Theatre
 Michael Kahn – Mourning Becomes Electra – The Shakespeare Theatre
 Serge Seiden – Old Wicked Songs – The Studio Theatre
 1999 Joe Calarco – Nijinsky's Last Dance – Signature Theatre
 Douglas C. Wager – You Can't Take It with You – Arena Stage
 Michael Kahn – Peer Gynt – The Shakespeare Theatre
 Seret Scott – The Old Settler – The Studio Theatre
 Thomas W. Jones II – Seven Guitars – The Studio Theatre
 Zeljko Djukic – Quartet – Open Theatre/TUTA
 2000 Joy Zinoman – Indian Ink – The Studio Theatre
 Andrei Malaev-Babel – The Idiot – Stanislavsky Theater Studio
 Hugo Medrano – La Dama Boba – GALA Hispanic Theatre
 Joe Banno – Edmond – Source Theatre Company
 Michael Kahn – King John – The Shakespeare Theatre
 Molly Smith – How I Learned to Drive – Arena Stage
 Paata Tsikurishvili – The Idiot – Stanislavsky Theater Studio
 2001 Donald Hicken – The Glass Menagerie – Round House Theatre and Everyman Theatre
 Howard Shalwitz – Heaven – Woolly Mammoth Theatre Company
 Jim Petosa – Collected Stories – Theater J
 Joe Calarco – Shakespeare's R & J – Folger Theatre
 Kasi Campbell – The Lonesome West – Rep Stage
 Michael Kahn – Timon of Athens – The Shakespeare Theatre
 Thomas W. Jones II – MASTER HAROLD ... and the boys – The Studio Theatre
 2002 Thomas Jones – Home – Round House Theatre
 John MacDonald – Major Barbara – Washington Stage Guild
 Joy Zinoman – Far East – Studio Theatre
 Joy Zinoman – The Invention of Love – Studio Theatre
 Michael Kahn – Don Carlos – Shakespeare Theatre
 Molly Smith – Agamemnon and His Daughters – Arena Stage
 2003 Paata Tsikurishvili – Hamlet – Synetic Theater
 Doug Hughes – The Little Foxes – The Shakespeare Theatre
 John Vreeke – Born Guilty – Theater J
 Joy Zinoman – Prometheus – The Studio Theatre
 Nick Olcott – The Weir – Round House Theatre
 Paata Tsikurishvili – Host and Guest – Synetic Theater

Outstanding Director of a Resident Musical
 1993 Eric D. Schaeffer – Assassins – Signature Theatre
 Douglas C. Wager – Of Thee I Sing – Arena Stage
 Joy Zinoman – Falsettoland – The Studio Theatre
 Mary Hall Surface – Tintypes – Round House Theatre
 Ron O'Leary – Closer Than Ever – The Rose Organization
 1995 David H. Bell – Hot Mikado – Ford's Theatre
 Catherine Flye – Iolanthe – Interact Theatre Company
 Eric D. Schaeffer – Into the Woods – Signature Theatre
 Eric D. Schaeffer – Wings – Signature Theatre
 Mike Malone – God's Trombones – DC ART/WORKS
 1996 James A. Petosa – Jacques Brel Is Alive and Well and Living in Paris – Olney Theatre Center for the Arts
 Thomas W. Jones II – Bessie's Blues – The Studio Theatre
 Catherine Flye – H.M.S. Pinafore – Interact Theatre Company
 Eric D. Schaeffer – Cabaret – Signature Theatre
 Mike Malone – Black Nativity – The Kennedy Center
 1997 Eric D. Schaeffer – Passion – Signature Theatre
 Catherine Flye – The Mikado – Interact Theatre Company
 Douglas C. Wager – Candide – Arena Stage
 Eric D. Schaeffer – The Rink – Signature Theatre
 Marsha A. Jackson-Randolph – Hip 2: Birth of the Boom – The Studio Theatre
 1998 Keith Alan Baker – Hair, The American Tribal Love-Rock Musical – The Studio Theatre Secondstage
 Catherine Flye – Down at the Old Bull & Bush – Interact Theatre Company
 Catherine Flye – Sherlock Holmes and the Case of the Purloined Patience or The Scandal at the D'Oyly Carte – Interact Theatre Company
 Eric D. Schaeffer – Sunday in the Park with George – Arena Stage
 Eric D. Schaeffer – Sunday in the Park with George – Signature Theatre
 Toby Orenstein – Joseph and the Amazing Technicolor Dreamcoat – Toby's Dinner Theatre
 1999 Jesse Berger – Marat/Sade – Washington Shakespeare Company
 Carole Lehan – Children of Eden – Toby's Dinner Theatre
 Toby Orenstein – Children of Eden – Toby's Dinner Theatre
 Catherine Flye – Great Expectations, the Musical – Interact Theatre Company
 Eric D. Schaeffer – The Fix – Signature Theatre in association with Cameron Mackintosh
 Keith Glover – Thunder Knocking on the Door – Arena Stage
 2000 Douglas C. Wager – Animal Crackers – Arena Stage
 Charles Randolph-Wright – Guys and Dolls – Arena Stage
 Eric D. Schaeffer – Sweeney Todd – Signature Theatre
 Jack Marshall – The Cradle Will Rock – The American Century Theater
 Mary Hall Surface – Grimm Tales – Theater of the First Amendment
 Thomas W. Jones II – Slam! – The Studio Theatre
 2001 Joe Calarco – Side Show – Signature Theatre
 David Petrarca – Dinah Was – Arena Stage
 Eric Schaeffer – The Rhythm Club – Signature Theatre
 Jerry Whiddon – You're a Good Man, Charlie Brown – Round House Theatre
 Mary Hall Surface – Sing Down the Moon: Appalachian Wonder Tales – Theater of the First Amendment
 Sheldon Epps – Play On! – Arena Stage
 2002 Mary Hall Surface – Perseus Bayou – Theatre of the First Amendment
 Catherine Flye – The Pirates of Penzance – Interact Theatre Company
 Darryl V. Jones – Spunk – African Continuum Theatre Company
 Eric D. Schaeffer – Putting it Together – Signature Theatre
 Kenny Leon – Blues in the Night – Arena Stage
 Toby Orenstein – Joseph and the Amazing Technicolor Dreamcoat – Toby's Dinner Theatre
 2003 Christopher Ashley – Sweeney Todd – The Kennedy Center
 Toby Orenstein – Jekyll & Hyde The Musical – Toby's Dinner Theatre
 Eric Schaeffer – Sunday in the Park with George – The Kennedy Center
 Eric Schaeffer – The Gospel According to Fishman – Signature Theatre
 Kyle Donnelly – Polk County – Arena Stage
 Molly Smith – South Pacific – Arena Stage

Writing

Best New Play
 1985 The Beautiful Lady – New Playwrights' Theatre
 Burial Customs – New Playwrights' Theatre
 The Shady Side – Source Theatre

Outstanding New Play
 1986 Ralph Hunt – Metamorphosis – Woolly Mammoth Theatre Company
 Alex Finlayson – Ladies' Side – Source Theatre Company
 Jr.,Paul J. Donnelly – After My Own Heart – New Playwrights' Theatre
 Phoef Sutton – Thin Wall – New Playwrights' Theatre
 1987 T J Edwards – New York Mets – Woolly Mammoth Theatre Company
 Julie Jensen – Stray Dogs – Arena Stage
 1988 T J Edwards – National Defense – Woolly Mammoth Theatre Company
 Bari Biern, Fred Anzevino, Paula Burns, Roberta Gasbarre, Roy Barber – A Dance Against Darkeness: Living With AIDS – D.C. Cabaret
 Ron Wood – Four Men from Annapolis – Touchstone Theatre Company
 1989 Larry L. King – The Night Hank Williams Died – New Playwrights' Theatre
 David Henry Hwang – M. Butterfly – The National Theatre
 David Lemos – More Than Names – New Playwrights' Theatre
 Heather McDonald – The Rivers and Ravines – Arena Stage
 John Bishop – Elmer Gantry – Ford's Theatre

The Charles MacArthur Award for Outstanding New Play
 1990 Deborah Pryor – Briar Patch – Arena Stage
 Aaron Sorkin – A Few Good Men – The Kennedy Center
 Bruce Clarke – Bluesman – Source Theatre Company
 Nick Olcott – A Turn of the Screw – The Washington Stage Guild
 Queen Esther Marrow – Don't Let This Dream Go (A Musical Celebration of Mahalia Jackson) – Ford's Theatre
 Stephen Wade – On the Way Home – Arena Stage
 1991 Oni Faida Lampley – Mixed Babies – The Washington Stage Guild
  Cornerstone Theater Company – The Video Store Owner's Significant Other – American Playwrights Theatre
 Barbara McConagha – Mother's Day – Source Theatre Company
 Dale Stein – A Fresh of Breath Air – Smallbeer Theatre Company
 Nick Mathwick – Waiting for Marge – Smallbeer Theatre Company
 Roy Barber – Children With Stones – Source Theatre Company
 Stuart Browne – Angel – No-Neck Monsters Theatre Company
 1992 Cheryl L. West – Before It Hits Home – Arena Stage
 Ari Roth – Born Guilty – Arena Stage
 Chandler Burr – Exquisite – Consenting Adults Theatre Company
 Christi Stewart-Brown – Do Not Use If Seal Is Broken – Consenting Adults Theatre Company
 Nick Olcott – Aspern Papers – The Washington Stage Guild
 Sherry Kramer – David's Redhaired Death – Woolly Mammoth Theatre Company
 Steve Carter – Spiele '36 or The Fourth Medal – Theater of the First Amendment
 1993 Lucy Tom Lehrer – Those Sweet Caresses – Source Theatre Company
 Christi Stewart-Brown – Morticians in Love – Consenting Adults Theatre Company
 Christi Stewart-Brown – Three More Sisters – Consenting Adults Theatre Company
 Drury L. Pifer – African Tourist – Woolly Mammoth Theatre Company
 Stanley Rutherford – Billy Nobody – Woolly Mammoth Theatre Company
 1994 Nicky Silver – Free Will and Wanton Lust – Woolly Mammoth Theatre Company
 Aubrey Wertheim – Make Way for Dyklings – Consenting Adults Theatre Company
 Aubrey Wertheim – Make Way for Dyklings – District of Columbia Arts Center
 Drury L. Pifer – Strindberg in Hollywood – Woolly Mammoth Theatre Company
 Harry Kondoleon – Half Off – Woolly Mammoth Theatre Company
 Janusz Glowacki – Antigone in New York – Arena Stage
 Karen L. B. Evans – My Girlish Days – MetroStage
 1995 Chris White – Rhythms – Horizons Theatre
 Diane Ney – Great Hunger – Consenting Adults Theatre Company
 John Strand – Otabenga – Signature Theatre
 Mustapha Matura – A Small World – Arena Stage
 Nicky Silver – The Food Chain – Woolly Mammoth Theatre Company
 1996 Amy Freed – The Psychic Life of Savages – Woolly Mammoth Theatre Company
  Charisma – A Night with Jackie "Moms" Mabley – American Theatre Project
 Adam Long, Austin Tichenor, Reed Martin – The Bible: The Complete Word of God (abridged) – The Kennedy Center
 Dianne McIntyre – I Could Stop on a Dime and Get Ten Cents Change – Theater of the First Amendment
 Ernest Joselovitz – Catskills Tzimmis – Theater J
 Susan Altman – Out of the Whirlwind – American Theatre Project
 1997 Jennifer L. Nelson – Torn From the Headlines – Everyday Theatre
 Jennifer L. Nelson – Torn From the Headlines – The African Continuum Theatre Company
 Allyson Currin – Amstel in Tel Aviv – Source Theatre Company
 Barbara McConagha – The Obituary Bowl – Woolly Mammoth Theatre Company
 Didier Rousselet, Monica Neagoy, Susan Haedicke – The Man Who Laughs – Le Neon French-American Theatre Company
 Ron O'Leary – They Never Said a Word – The Rose Organization
 1998 Nick Olcott – Sherlock Holmes and the Case of the Purloined Patience or The Scandal at the D'Oyly Carte – Interact Theatre Company
 Carole Lehan, Jim Petosa – Look! We Have Come Through! – Olney Theatre Center for the Arts
 Norman Allen – Melville Slept Here – Signature Theatre
 Regina Porter – Tripping Through the Car House – Woolly Mammoth Theatre Company
 Sherry Kramer – Things That Break – Theater of the First Amendment
 1999 John Strand – Lovers and Executioners – Arena Stage
 Caleen Sinnette Jennings – Playing Juliet/Casting Othello – Folger Shakespeare Library
 Caleen Sinnette Jennings – Playing Juliet/Casting Othello – Source Theatre Company
 Christi Stewart-Brown – The Gene Pool – Woolly Mammoth Theatre Company
 Lisa Loomer – Expecting Isabel – Arena Stage
 Norman Allen – Nijinsky's Last Dance – Signature Theatre
 Norman Allen – Waiting In Tobolsk: the Children of the Last Tsar – Moonlight Theatre Company
 2000 Karen Zacar as – The Sins of Sor Juana – Theater of the First Amendment
 Caleen Sinnette Jennings – Inns & Outs – Source Theatre Company
 Chris Stezin – Hoboken Station – Charter Theatre
 Oni Faida Lampley – The Dark Kalamazoo – Woolly Mammoth Theatre Company
 Robert Alexander – The Last Orbit of Billy Mars – Woolly Mammoth Theatre Company
 Sam Schwartz, Jr. – Courting Chris – The Church Street Theater
 Sam Schwartz, Jr. – Courting Chris – The Theater Alliance
 2001 Peter Coy – A House in the Country – Charter Theatre
 Ari Roth – Life in Refusal – Theater J
 Chad Beguelin, Matthew Sklar – The Rhythm Club – Signature Theatre
 Charles Randolph-Wright – Blue – Arena Stage
 David Lindsay-Abaire – Wonder of the World – Woolly Mammoth Theatre Company
 David Maddox, Mary Hall Surface – Sing Down the Moon: Appalachian Wonder Tales – Theater of the First Amendment
 2002 Norman Allen – In the Garden – Signature Theatre
 David Maddox, Mary Hall Surface – Perseus Bayou – Theatre of the First Amendment
 Martha King De Silva – Stretch Marks – Charter Theatre
 Paul D'Andrea – Nathan the Wise – Theatre of the First Amendment
 Roberto Aguirre-Sacasa – The Muckle Man – Source Theatre Company
 2003 Ernie Joselovitz – Shakespeare, Moses, and Joe Papp – Round House Theatre
 Allyson Currin – Church of the Open Mind – Charter Theatre
 Craig Wright – Recent Tragic Events – Woolly Mammoth Theatre Company
 John Strand – The Diaries – Signature Theatre
 Joshua Ford – Miklat – Theater J
 Paul Donnelly – The Taste of Fire – Charter Theatre

The Charles MacArthur Award for Outstanding New Musical
 2003 Dorothy Waring, Kathy Madison, Kyle Donnelly, Stephen Wade, Zora Neale Hurston – Polk County – Arena Stage
 David Maddox, Mary Hall Surface – Mississippi Pinocchio – Theater of the First Amendment
 Thomas W. Jones, II – Harlem Rose, A Love Song to Langston Hughes – MetroStage
 Thomas W. Jones, II – Three Sistahs – MetroStage
 Janet Pryce, William Hubbard – Three Sistahs – MetroStage
 Michael Lazar, Richard Oberacker – The Gospel According to Fishman – Signature Theatre
 Norman Allen – The Christmas Carol Rag – Signature Theatre

See also
Helen Hayes Awards Non-Resident Acting
Helen Hayes Awards Non-Resident Production
Helen Hayes Awards Resident Acting
Helen Hayes Awards Resident Design

References

Sources
 

Helen Hayes Awards